Golmaal is a 2019 Tulu language film directed by Ramanand Nayak starring Pruthvi Ambaar, Sherya Anchan in lead roles and Sai Kumar, Naveen D Padil, Aravind Bolar,  Bhojaraj Vamanjoor, Sathish Bandale, Umesh Mijar, Sunder Rai Mandara , Sunil Nelligudde, Sandeep Shetty Manibettu,  Prasanna Shetty Bailoor in supporting roles. Golmaal is produced under the banner of Mahakali Mahamanthra Creations by Manjunath Nayak and Akshay Prabhu.

Cast
 Pruthvi Ambaar
 Sherya Anchan 
Sai Kumar (Malayalam actor)
Naveen D Padil
Aravind Bolar
Bhojaraj Vamanjoor 
 Umesh Mijar
 Sathish Bandale
Sunder Rai 
 Sunil Nelligudde
 Sandeep Shetty Manibettu
 Prasanna Shetty Bailoor

Soundtrack
The soundtracks of the film were composed by Sunaad Gowtham.

References

2019 films